Cape Dubouzet is a cape that marks the northeastern extremity of Trinity Peninsula and the Antarctic Peninsula.

The point was charted in 1838 by a French expedition under Captain Jules Dumont d'Urville, who named it for Lieutenant Joseph DuBouzet of the expedition ship Zélée. The approved spelling form has been established by usage.

References 

Headlands of Trinity Peninsula